Digenea (Gr. Dis – double, Genos – race) is a class of trematodes in the Platyhelminthes phylum, consisting of parasitic flatworms (known as flukes) with a syncytial tegument and, usually, two suckers, one ventral and one oral. Adults commonly live within the digestive tract, but occur throughout the organ systems of all classes of vertebrates. Once thought to be related to the Monogenea, it is now recognised that they are closest to the Aspidogastrea and that the Monogenea are more closely allied with the Cestoda. Around 6,000 species have been described to date.

Morphology

Key features
Characteristic features of the Digenea include a syncytial tegument; that is, a tegument where the junctions between cells are broken down and a single continuous cytoplasm surrounds the entire animal. A similar tegument is found in other members of the Neodermata; a group of platyhelminths comprising the Digenea, Aspidogastrea, Monogenea and Cestoda.  Digeneans possess a vermiform, unsegmented body-plan and have a solid parenchyma with no body cavity (coelom) as in all platyhelminths.

There are typically two suckers, an anterior oral sucker surrounding the mouth, and a ventral sucker sometimes termed the acetabulum, on the ventral surface.  The oral sucker surrounds the mouth, while the ventral sucker is a blind muscular organ with no connection to any internal structure.

A monostome is a worm with one sucker (oral). Flukes with an oral sucker and an acetabulum at the posterior end of the body are called Amphistomes. Distomes are flukes with an oral sucker and a ventral sucker, but the ventral sucker is somewhere other than posterior.  These terms are common in older literature, when they were thought to reflect systematic relationships within the groups.  They have fallen out of use in modern digenean taxonomy.

Reproductive system
The vast majority of digeneans are hermaphrodites. This is likely to be an adaptation to low abundance within hosts, allowing the life cycle to continue when only one individual successfully infects the final host. Fertilisation is internal, with sperm being transferred via the cirrus to the Laurer's Canal or genital aperture. A key group of digeneans which are dioecious are the schistosomes.
Asexual reproduction in the first larval stage is ubiquitous.

While the sexual formation of the digenean eggs and asexual reproduction in the first larval stage (miracidium) is widely reported, the developmental biology of the asexual stages remains a problem. Electron microscopic studies have shown that the light microscopically visible germ balls consist of mitotically dividing cells which give rise to embryos and to a line of new germ cells that become included in these embryonic stages. Since the absence of meiotic processes is not proven, the exact definition remains doubtful.

Male organs
Protandry is the general rule among the Digenea. Usually two testes are present, but some flukes can have more than 100. Also present are vasa efferentia, a vas deferens, seminal vesicle, ejaculatory duct and a cirrus (analogous to a penis) usually (but not always) enclosed in a cirrus sac.  The cirrus may or may not be covered in proteinaceous spines.  The exact conformation of these organs within the male terminal genitalia is taxonomically important at the familial and generic levels.

Female organs
Usually there is a single ovary with an oviduct, a seminal receptacle, a pair of vitelline glands (involved in yolk and egg-shell production) with ducts, the ootype (a chamber where eggs are formed), a complex collection of glands cells called Mehlis’ gland, which is believed to lubricate the uterus for egg passage.

In addition, some digeneans possess a canal called Laurer's Canal, which leads from the oviduct to the dorsal surface of the body.  The function of this canal is debated, but it may be used for insemination in some species or for disposal of waste products from reproduction in other species.
Most trematodes possess an ovicapt, an enlarged portion of the oviduct where it joins the ovary. It probably controls the release of ova and spaces out their descent down the uterus.

The uterus typically opens into a common genital atrium that also received the distal male copulatory organ (cirrus) before immediately opening onto the outer surface of the worm.  The distal part of the uterus may be expanded into a metraterm, set off from the proximal uterus by a muscular sphincter, or  it may be lined with spines, as in the Monorchiidae and some other families.

Digestive system
As adults, most digeneans possess a terminal or subterminal mouth, a muscular pharynx that provides the force for ingesting food, and a forked, blind digestive system consisting of two tubular sacs called caeca (sing. caecum).  In some species the two gut caeca join posteriorly to make a ring-shaped gut or cyclocoel.  In others the caeca may fuse with the body wall posteriorly to make one or more anuses, or with the excretory vesicle to form a uroproct.  Digeneans are also capable of direct nutrient uptake through the tegument by pinocytosis and phagocytosis by the syncitium. Most adult digeneans occur in the vertebrate alimentary canal or its associated organs, where they most often graze on contents of the lumen (e.g., food ingested by the host, bile, mucus), but they may also feed across the mucosal wall (e.g., submucosa, host blood).  The blood flukes, such as schistosomes, spirorchiids and sanguinicolids, feed exclusively on blood. Asexual stages in mollusc intermediate hosts feed mostly by direct absorption, although the redia stage found in some groups does have a mouth, pharynx and simple gut and may actively consume host tissue or even other parasites.  Encysted metacercarial stages and free-living cercarial stages do not feed.

Nervous system
Paired ganglia at the anterior end of the body serve as the brain. From this nerves extend anteriorly and posteriorly. Sensory receptors are, for the most part, lacking among the adults, although they do have tangoreceptor cells. Larval stages have many kinds of sensory receptors, including light receptors and chemoreceptors. Chemoreception plays an important role in the free-living miracidial larva recognising and locating its host.

Life cycles
There is a bewildering array of variation on the complex digenean life cycle, and plasticity in this trait is probably a key to the group's success. In general, the life cycles may have two, three, or four obligate (necessary) hosts, sometimes with transport or paratenic hosts in between. The three-host life cycle is probably the most common.  In almost all species, the first host in the life cycle is a mollusc. This has led to the inference that the ancestral digenean was a mollusc parasite and that vertebrate hosts were added subsequently.

The alternation of sexual and asexual generations is an important feature of digeneans. This phenomenon involves the presence of several discrete generations in one life-cycle.

A typical digenean trematode life cycle is as follows.  Eggs leave the vertebrate host in faeces and use various strategies to infect the first intermediate host, in which sexual reproduction does not occur. Digeneans may infect the first intermediate host (usually a snail) by either passive or active means. The eggs of some digeneans, for example, are (passively) eaten by snails (or, rarely, by an annelid worm), in which they proceed to hatch. Alternatively, eggs may hatch in water to release an actively swimming, ciliated larva, the miracidium, which must locate and penetrate the body wall of the snail host.

After post-ingestion hatching or penetration of the snail, the miracidium metamorphoses into a simple, sac-like mother sporocyst. The mother sporocyst undergoes a round of internal asexual reproduction, giving rise to either rediae (sing. redia) or daughter sporocysts. The second generation is thus the daughter parthenita sequence. These in turn undergo further asexual reproduction, ultimately yielding large numbers of the second free-living stage, the cercaria (pl. cercariae).

Free-swimming cercariae leave the snail host and move through the aquatic or marine environment, often using a whip-like tail, though a tremendous diversity of tail morphology is seen. Cercariae are infective to the second host in the life cycle, and infection may occur passively (e.g., a fish consumes a cercaria) or actively (the cercaria penetrates the fish).

The life cycles of some digeneans include only two hosts, the second being a vertebrate. In these groups, sexual maturity occurs after the cercaria penetrates the second host, which is in this case also the definitive host. Two-host life cycles can be primary (there never was a third host) as in the Bivesiculidae, or secondary (there was at one time in evolutionary history a third host but it has been lost).

In three-host life cycles, cercariae develop in the second intermediate host into a resting stage, the metacercaria, which is usually encysted in a cyst of host and parasite origin, or encapsulated in a layer of tissue derived from the host only. This stage is infective to the definitive host. Transmission occurs when the definitive host preys upon an infected second intermediate host. Metacercariae excyst in the definitive host's gut in response to a variety of physical and chemical signals, such as gut pH levels, digestive enzymes, temperature, etc. Once excysted, adult digeneans migrate to more or less specific sites in the definitive host and the life cycle repeats.

Evolution
The evolutionary origins of the Digenea have been debated for some time, but there appears general agreement that the proto-digenean was a parasite of a mollusc, possibly of the mantle cavity.  Evidence for this comes from the ubiquity of molluscs as first intermediate hosts for digeneans, and the fact that most aspidogastreans (the sister group to the Digenea) also have mollusc associations.  It is thought that the early trematodes (the collective name for digeneans and aspidogastreans) likely evolved from rhabdocoel turbellarians that colonised the open mantle cavity of early molluscs.

It is likely that more complex life cycles evolved through a process of terminal addition, whereby digeneans survived predation of their mollusc host, probably by a fish.  Other hosts were added by the same process until the modern bewildering diversity of life cycle patterns developed.

Important families
Digenea includes about 80 families. They are listed below, organised by order.

Digenea
Diplostomida
Suborder Diplostomata
Superfamily Brachylaimoidea Joyeux & Foley, 1930
Brachylaimidae Joyeux & Foley, 1930
Leucochloridiidae Poche, 1907
Superfamily Diplostomoidea Poirier, 1886
Brauninidae Wolf, 1903
Cyathocotylidae Mühling, 1898
Diplostomidae Poirier, 1886
Proterodiplostomidae Dubois, 1936
Strigeidae Railliet, 1919
Superfamily Schistosomatoidea Stiles & Hassall, 1898
Aporocotylidae Odhner, 1912
Schistosomatidae Stiles & Hassall, 1898
Spirorchiidae Stunkard, 1921
Plagiorchiida
Apocreadiata
Apocreadioidea Skrjabin, 1942
Apocreadiidae Skrjabin, 1942
Bivesiculata
Bivesiculoidea
Bivesiculidae Yamaguti, 1934
Bucephalata
Bucephaloidea Poche, 1907
Bucephalidae Poche, 1907
Nuitrematidae Kurochkin, 1975
Gymnophalloidea Odhner, 1905
Botulisaccidae Yamaguti, 1971
Fellodistomidae Nicoll, 1909
Gymnophallidae Odhner, 1905
Tandanicolidae Johnston, 1927
Echinostomata
Echinostomatoidea Looss, 1902
Calycodidae Dollfus, 1929
Cyclocoelidae Stossich, 1902
Echinochasmidae Odhner, 1910
Echinostomatidae Looss, 1899
Eucotylidae Cohn, 1904
Fasciolidae Railliet, 1895
Himasthlidae Odhner, 1910
Philophthalmidae Looss, 1899
Psilostomidae Looss, 1900
Rhytidodidae Odhner, 1926
Typhlocoelidae Harrah, 1922
Haplosplanchnata
Haplosplanchnoidea Poche, 1925
Haplosplanchnidae Poche, 1926
Hemiurata
Azygioidea Lühe, 1909
Azygiidae Lühe, 1909
Hemiuroidea Looss, 1899
Accacoeliidae Odhner, 1911
Bathycotylidae Dollfus, 1932
Derogenidae Nicoll, 1910
Dictysarcidae Skrjabin & Guschanskaja, 1955
Didymozoidae Monticelli, 1888
Gonocercidae Skrjabin & Guschanskaja, 1955
Hemiuridae Looss, 1899
Hirudinellidae Dollfus, 1932
Isoparorchiidae Travassos, 1922
Lecithasteridae Odhner, 1905
Ptychogonimidae Dollfus, 1937
Sclerodistomidae Odhner, 1927
Sclerodistomoididae Gibson & Bray, 1979
Syncoeliidae Looss, 1899
Heronimata
Heronimoidea Ward, 1918
Heronimidae Ward, 1918
Lepocreadiata
Lepocreadioidea Odhner, 1905
Aephnidiogenidae Yamaguti, 1934
Deropristidae Cable & Hunninen, 1942
Enenteridae Yamaguti, 1958
Gorgocephalidae Manter, 1966
Gyliauchenidae Fukui, 1929
Lepidapedidae Yamaguti, 1958
Lepocreadiidae Odhner, 1905
Liliatrematidae Gubanov, 1953
Monorchiata
Monorchioidea Odhner, 1911
Lissorchiidae Magath, 1917
Monorchiidae Odhner, 1911
Opisthorchiata
Opisthorchioidea Braun, 1901
Cryptogonimidae Ward, 1917
Heterophyidae Leiper, 1909
Opisthorchiidae Looss, 1899
Pronocephalata
Paramphistomoidea Fischoeder, 1901
Cladorchiidae Fischoeder, 1901
Mesometridae Poche, 1926
Microscaphidiidae Looss, 1900
Paramphistomidae Fischoeder, 1901
Pronocephaloidea Looss, 1899
Labicolidae Blair, 1979
Notocotylidae Lühe, 1909
Nudacotylidae Barker, 1916
Opisthotrematidae Poche, 1926
Pronocephalidae Looss, 1899
Rhabdiopoeidae Poche, 1926
Transversotremata
Transversotrematoidea Witenberg, 1944
Transversotrematidae Witenberg, 1944
Xiphidiata
Allocreadioidea Looss, 1902
Acanthocolpidae Lühe, 1906
Allocreadiidae Looss, 1902
Batrachotrematidae Dollfus & Williams, 1966
Brachycladiidae Odhner, 1905
Opecoelidae Ozaki, 1925
Gorgoderoidea Looss, 1901
Callodistomidae Odhner, 1910
Dicrocoeliidae Looss, 1899
Gorgoderidae Looss, 1899
Haploporoidea Nicoll, 1914
Atractotrematidae Yamaguti, 1939
Haploporidae Nicoll, 1914
Microphalloidea Ward, 1901
Diplangidae Yamaguti, 1971
Exotidendriidae Mehra, 1935
Faustulidae Poche, 1926
Microphallidae Ward, 1901
Pachypsolidae Yamaguti, 1958
Phaneropsolidae Mehra, 1935
Pleurogenidae Looss, 1899
Prosthogonimidae Lühe, 1909
Renicolidae Dollfus, 1939
Zoogonidae Odhner, 1902
Plagiorchioidea Lühe, 1901
Auridistomidae Lühe, 1901
Brachycoeliidae Looss, 1899
Cephalogonimidae Looss, 1899
Choanocotylidae Jue Sue & Platt, 1998
Echinoporidae Krasnolobova & Timofeeva, 1965
Encyclometridae Mehra, 1931
Leptophallidae Dayal, 1938
Macroderoididae McMullen, 1937
Meristocotylidae Fischthal & Kuntz, 1981
Ocadiatrematidae Fischthal & Kuntz, 1981
Orientocreadiidae Yamaguti, 1958
Plagiorchiidae Lühe, 1901
Styphlotrematidae Baer, 1924
Telorchiidae Looss, 1899
Thrinascotrematidae Jue Sue & Platt, 1999
Urotrematidae Poche, 1926

Human digenean infections
Only about 12 of the 6,000 known species are infectious to humans, but some of these species are important diseases afflicting over 200 million people. The species that infect humans can be divided into groups, the schistosomes and the non-schistosomes.

Schistosomes
The Schistosomes occur in the circulatory system of the definitive host. Humans become infected after free-swimming cercaria liberated from infected snails penetrate the skin. These dioecious worms are long and thin, ranging in size from 10 to 30 mm in length to 0.2 to 1.0 mm in diameter. Adult males are shorter and thicker than females, and have a long groove along one side of the body in which the female is clasped. Females reach sexual maturity after they have been united with a male. After mating the two remain locked together for the rest of their lives. They can live for several years and produce many thousands of eggs.

The four species of schistosomes that infect humans are members of the genus Schistosoma.

Non-schistosomes

The seven major species of non-schistosomes that infect humans are listed below. People become infected after ingesting metacercarial cysts on plants or in undercooked animal flesh. Most species inhabit the human gastrointestinal tract, where they shed eggs along with host feces. Paragonimus westermani, which colonizes the lungs, can also pass its eggs in saliva. These flukes generally cause mild pathology in humans, but more serious effects may also occur.

References

Notes 

 Gibson, D.I., Jones, A. & Bray, R.A. (2002). Key to the Trematoda, vol.1 
 Littlewood D.T.J. & Bray R.A. (2001) Interrelationships of the Platyhelminthes. 
 Yamaguti, S. (1971). Synopsis of digenetic trematodes of vertebrates. Keigaku Publishing Co., Tokyo.

External links

Cambridge University Schistosome Research Group
Parasitic Worms at the Natural History Museum, London
Fishdisease.net

 
Protostome subclasses